Tavares High School is a high school located in Tavares, Florida, United States, and is one of seven public high schools operated by Lake County Schools in Lake County, Florida. The school was built in 1926 and originally housed grades 9 and 10. In 1927, grades 11 and 12 were added, making it a true high school. It is made up of approximately 2,000 students.  and the current principal is Jacob Stein

Sports
Baseball
Basketball
Bowling
Cross country
Football
Golf
Marching band
Softball
Swimming
Track and field
Tennis
Volleyball
Weightlifting

Notable alumni
Jermaine Taylor - Professional basketball player
Brady Singer - Major League Baseball player
Mark Kolozsvary - Major League Baseball player

References

External links
 

High schools in Lake County, Florida
Public high schools in Florida
Educational institutions established in 1926
1926 establishments in Florida